Youth leaders are persons that are active in youth work field.

Youth leaders, educator or youth counsellor are not the same as Child and Youth Worker named persons in Canada and United States of America, which are therapeutics youth workers.
They are also Youth Workers, or Youth Support Workers.

When acting in youth communities, they are called Community youth workers.

Training
In several countries they take special trainings in order to be employed.

For instance for non-professional Youth Leaders:

 In UK, National Vocational Qualification or Vocationally Related Qualification, Level 2 or 3 can be required (it replaced the RAMPs training).
 In other countries like Germany or France, specific certificates can be required by the employer ("JuLeiCa" in Germany and "BAFA" in France, higher are professional graduate programs).

For professional Youth Workers, professional qualification programmes of study are offered by universities or colleges of higher education.

See also 
Youth Workers, Community youth workers, Youth Work Dr. Muhammad Saud also considered as youth activist

References

Youth work